Omari Mikhaylovich Tetradze (born 13 October 1969 as Omari Mikhaylovich Osipov) is a Georgian-Russian professional football manager and former player who currently manages Saburtalo Tbilisi. During his playing career, he represented Russia at international level.

Early life
Tetradze was born in Velispiri, Georgian SSR as Omari Mikhaylovich Osipov (the original surname of his family was Iosifidis) to ethnic Greek parents. At the age of 18, he decided to change surname when he turned professional. It was the run-up to the USSR breakup and the nationalist sentiments in Georgia were strong enough to affect the young player's career. Because of that, Omari took his maternal grandmother's Georgian surname – Tetradze. Later he considered restoring his original surname, but decided it would cause too many problems.

Club career
At club level, Tetradze played for Dinamo Tbilisi, FC Dynamo Moscow, Alania Vladikavkaz (where he won a Russian league championship medal in 1995), AS Roma, and PAOK FC (Greece).

International career
Tetradze played for Russia at international level, and appeared at World Cup 1994 and Euro 1996. At the latter tournament, he played superbly in each of Russia's three games despite the team's poor results, and was arguably the best right-back in the competition.

Managing career
After finishing his playing career in 2005, Tetradze became an assistant coach at Krylia Sovetov Samara. He was later the manager of Anzhi Makhachkala. He threatened to resign the post in September 2008 following a 1–0 defeat against Belgorod, but subsequently stayed on as manager. Anzhi finally returned to Russian Premier League for 2010 season after finishing champion in First Division. On 19 March 2010 the Coach has quit Anzhi Makhachkala.

In September 2014, Tetradze and his coaching staff left FC Zhetysu by mutual consent.

On 30 May 2016, Tetradze was appointed as manager of FC Tobol. He left Tobol by mutual consent on 27 June 2017.

Personal life
In the early 1990s he received Greek citizenship but later renounced it. Tetradze considers himself to be a Greek by ethnicity, but says Georgia is his homeland.

Career statistics

Honours

Player
 Russian Premier League winner in 1995 (with Spartak-Alania)
 Greek Cup winner in 2001 (with PAOK)
 Russian Premier League runner-up: 1994, 1996.
 Georgian Umaglesi Liga winner: 1990.
 Russian Cup finalist: 2004.

Manager
Anzhi Makhachkala
 Russian First Division winner: 2009
 Russian First Division best manager: 2009.

Volga Nizhny Novgorod
 Russian First Division runner-up: 2010

References

External links
 Club profile 
 Profile at RussiaTeam 
 Tetradze threatens to quit Anzhi

1969 births
Living people
Georgian people of Greek descent
Russian people of Greek descent
Russian sportspeople of Georgian descent
Naturalized citizens of Greece
Georgian emigrants to Greece
People from Kvemo Kartli
Soviet footballers
Footballers from Georgia (country)
Russian footballers
Association football fullbacks
FC Dinamo Tbilisi players
FC Mertskhali Ozurgeti players
FC Dynamo Moscow players
FC Spartak Vladikavkaz players
A.S. Roma players
PAOK FC players
FC Anzhi Makhachkala players
PFC Krylia Sovetov Samara players
Soviet Top League players
Russian Premier League players
Serie A players
Super League Greece players
Dual internationalists (football)
Soviet Union international footballers
Russia international footballers
1994 FIFA World Cup players
UEFA Euro 1996 players
Russian expatriate footballers
Russian expatriate sportspeople in Greece
Russian expatriate sportspeople in Italy
Expatriate footballers in Greece
Expatriate footballers in Italy
Russian football managers
FC Anzhi Makhachkala managers
FC Volga Nizhny Novgorod managers
FC Khimki managers
FC Zhetysu managers
FC Yenisey Krasnoyarsk managers
FC Tobol managers
Russian Premier League managers
Russian expatriate football managers
Russian expatriate sportspeople in Kazakhstan
Expatriate football managers in Kazakhstan